The Danube is a 2021 Russian film. Directorial debut of screenwriter Lyubov Mulmenko. The film premiered on September 23, 2021 at the Kinotavr.

Plot 
Nadya came from Moscow on vacation to Belgrade. At the bar, she met the charming Serb Nesha, who knows a little Russian, and began an affair. Nesha's lifestyle is very far from Nadya's planned life in Moscow. He dresses funny, earns money by juggling on the streets in front of cars standing at traffic lights, he does not have a permanent home or even a mobile phone. This unusual relaxed life captivates the heroine. Nadya learns to live in a new way and makes an impulsive decision to stay in Belgrade. But the heady feeling of happiness and freedom dissipates, and this idea no longer seems so tempting to her.

Cast 
 Nadezhda Lumpova as Nadya
 Nenad Vasich as Nesha

Critical response 
Film critic Anton Dolin  in Meduza notes in his review:
Wherever you fly away, you will still take your personal Danube with you. There are borders that even rivers cannot cross.
In turn, Andrei Plakhov said:
The result is a film that is pleasant to watch, easy to breathe, and in which all the artistic elements seem to float freely with the flow, but are so adjusted to each other that it is impossible to find out  where is whose gift. However, the impression of lightness is also deceiving: enough bitterness will accumulate in free floating to make the expected ending become an emotional shock.

References

External links 
 

Films set in Belgrade
2020s Russian-language films
Russian romantic drama films
2020s Serbian-language films

2021 directorial debut films
2021 romantic drama films